Knockando is a village in Moray, Scotland. It is a farming centre and the location of both the Knockando distillery and the Tamdhu distillery.

It is also the location of Knockando Woolmill, which has been producing textiles since 1784 and which achieved national fame as a finalist in the second series of the BBC's Restoration television series in 2004.

Notable people
 John Mackenzie (1835–1899), missionary to South Africa, born in Knockando parish
 James William Grant FRSE (1788–1865), astronomer

Sir Archibald Levin Smith is buried in Knockando churchyard having died of a broken heart two months after his wife drowned nearby in the River Spey.

See also
 Knockando distillery, located in Knockando
 Dalbeallie railway station, on the former Strathspey Railway (GNoSR) line

References

Villages in Moray